HJR may refer to:

 Civil Aerodrome Khajuraho, in Madhya Pradesh, India
 Hampstead Junction Railway, in England
 Hedjaz Jordan Railway, in Jordan
 Hepatojugular reflux, also known as abdominojugular test
 The Henry James Review
 House joint resolution